The 2010 FIM Sidecarcross World Championship, the 31st edition of the competition, started on 5 April and finished after fourteen race weekends on 12 September 2010.

The defending champions were Joris Hendrickx from Belgium and Kaspars Liepins from Latvia. The championship was won by Daniël Willemsen from the Netherlands, his eighth title, with his compatriot Gertie Eggink as his passenger. In the final two races of the season, Willemsen used Dagwin Sabbe as his passenger, replacing Eggink.

Parallel to the riders competition, a manufacturers championship was also held, which was won by WSP, with VMC coming second.

The Sidecarcross World Championship, first held in 1980 and organised by the Fédération Internationale de Motocyclisme, is an annual competition. All races, manufacturers and the vast majority of riders in the competition being in and from Europe. Sidecarcross is similar to motocross except that the teams consist of two riders, a driver and a passenger. Races are held on the same tracks as solo motocross but the handling of the machines differs as sidecars don't lean. The majority of physical work in the sport is carried out by the passenger, who speeds up the sidecarcross in corners by leaning out. The coordination between the driver and the passenger are therefore of highest importance.

Overview
The fourteen races of the season were held in twelve countries, Netherlands, Great Britain, France, Italy, Poland, Ukraine, Belgium, Germany, Estonia, Latvia, Russia and Denmark. It was the first time since 2001, that the championship returned to Great Britain. Italy was last on the calendar in 2008, the other ten countries all hosted races in 2009, too. The Swiss GP, which was held for the first time since 2001 in 2009, was again dropped from the schedule.

Format

Every Grand Prix weekend is split into two races, both held on the same day. This means, the 2011 season with its thirteen Grand Prix has 26 races. Each race lasts for 30 minutes plus two laps. The two races on a weekend actually get combined to determine an overall winner. In case of a tie, the results of the second race as used to determined the winner. While this overall winners receives no extra WC points, they usually are awarded a special trophy. Race start times are set at 13:30 and 16:00.

Events typically consist of a qualifying competition, held in multiple stages on Saturdays of a race weekend while the two race events are typically held on Sundays. One exception to this rule is Easter weekends, when the races are held on Easter Monday. Race weekends can consist of additional motocross or quart support races as well, but the FIM stipulates that the World Championship races have priority. Riders have to be provided with at least one 30 minute free practice season, which will be timed. A race can consist of up to 30 starters and the qualifying modus is dependent on the number of entries. Up to 32 entries, it will be held in one group split into two sessions of 30 minutes each. Above 32 entries, the starter field will be sub-divided into two groups through ballot and the current standings. Each qualifying group can consist of up to 30 racers. Should there be more than 60 entries, a pre-qualifying has to be held. Of the riders in the two groups, the top-twelve directly qualify for the races. The remaining teams then go to a second-chance qualifying, in which the best six advance. The riders placed seventh and eighth remain in reserve should one of the qualified teams not be able to participate.

The FIM stipulates that all drivers must be of a minimum age of 18 while passengers have to be at least 16 years old to compete, but no older than 50. Riders older than 50 have to provide a certificate of medical fitness to be permitted to compete. The driver has the right to exchange his passenger under certain conditions.

Starting numbers for the season are awarded according to the previous seasons overall finishing position of the driver. Current or former World Champions have however the right to pick any number they wish, except the number one which is reserved for the current World Champion.

The competition is open for motor cycles with two-stroke engines from between 350 and 750cc and four-stroke engines of up to 1,000cc. Each team is permitted the use of two motorcycles with the possibility of changing machines between races.

The FIM does not permit radio communication between riders and their teams. Outside assistance during the race on the course is not permitted unless it is through race marshals in the interest of safety. Limited repairs in the designated repair zone during the race are permitted.

The first twenty teams of each race score competition points. The point system for the 2010 season is as follows:

Prize money
In 2010, prize money was awarded to all rider scoring points, with €300 going to each race winner, €250 to the runners-up, gradually declining from there, with  €50 going to all teams placed 12th to 20th. Additionally, every team qualified for the race plus the two reserve teams receive €500 in travel compensation.

Calendar
The calendar for the 2010 season:

 The Sidecarcross des Nations is a non-championship event but part of the calendar and is denoted by a light blue background in the table above.
 Flags for passengers not shown.

Classification

Riders
The top ten teams in the final overall standings were:

 Equipment listed is motor and frame.

Manufacturers
Parallel to the riders championship, a manufacturers competition is also held. In every race, only the best-placed rider of every make is awarded points in this competition.

The final overall standings in the manufacturers competition were:

2010 season races

Oldebroek - Netherlands
The top ten of the first Grand Prix of the 2010 season, held on Easter Monday, 5 April 2010, at Oldebroek in the Netherlands:

Langrish - Great Britain
The top ten of the British Grand Prix, held on 18 April at Langrish:

Plomion - France
The top ten of the first of two French Grand Prix in 2010, held on 2 May at Plomion:

Cingoli - Italy
The top ten of the Italian Grand Prix in 2010, held on 16 May at Cingoli:

Wschowa - Poland
The top ten of the Polish Grand Prix in 2010, held on 6 June at Wschowa:

Chernivtsi - Ukraine
The top ten of the Ukrainian Grand Prix in 2010, held on 13 June at Chernivtsi:

Genk - Belgium
The top ten of the Belgian Grand Prix in 2010, held on 4 July at Genk:

Strassbessenbach - Germany
The top ten of the first of two German Grand Prix in 2010, held on 11 July at Strassbessenbach:

Saint-Mamet - France
The top ten of the second of two French Grand Prix in 2010, held on 18 July at Saint-Mamet:

Kiviõli - Estonia
The top ten of the Estonian Grand Prix in 2010, held on 1 August at Kiviõli:

Ķegums - Latvia
The top ten of the Latvian Grand Prix in 2010, held on 8 August at Ķegums:

Penza - Russia
The top ten of the Russian Grand Prix in 2010, held on 15 August at Penza:

Slagelse - Denmark
The top ten of the Danish Grand Prix in 2010, held on 5 September at Slagelse:

Rudersberg - Germany
The top ten of the second German Grand Prix in 2010, held on 12 September at Rudersberg:

Notes

 Flags for passengers not shown.

Race by race statistics
The final classification of all 72 teams in the points during the 2010 season and their points scored in each individual race:

References

External links
 The World Championship on Sidecarcross.com
 The John Davey Grand Prix Pages – Results of all GP's up until 2005
 FIM Sidecar Motocross World Championship 2010

Sidecarcross world chmapionship, 2010
Sidecarcross World Championship seasons